Trent Eric Croad (born 9 March 1980) is a former professional Australian rules footballer who played for the Hawthorn Football Club and Fremantle Football Club in the Australian Football League (AFL).

During his 222-game AFL career, he achieved some of the Australian Football League's highest honours including an AFL premiership medallion, All-Australian selection, and representing Australia and Victoria on multiple occasions.

Early life
Born in Auckland, New Zealand, to mother and father Bruce, and the grandson of All Black Eric Boggs Croad migrated with his family to Australia and grew up in Narre Warren in Victoria. He began playing at a young age with Endeavour Hills and the Narre Warren Junior Football Club and attended De La Salle College, Malvern.

He was scouted by recruiters as a 17-year-old and nominated for the 1997 AFL Draft. Croad was invited to the AFL Draft camp where he set the draft camp record for a standing vertical jump at 83 cm, which remained for at least a decade.

AFL career

Hawthorn
Hawthorn picked up Croad with the third overall selection in the draft. He started out as a defender, playing at either centre half-back or fullback. But he showed his versatility as his career went on, being able to play in any number of key positions.

Fremantle
Croad was traded from Hawthorn to Fremantle at the end of 2001. The picks given up by Fremantle were used by Hawthorn to select former Hawthorn stars Luke Hodge and Sam Mitchell, whilst Luke McPharlin joined Croad in moving west. While Croad was reasonable but not spectacular at the Dockers, in 2002, he was Fremantle's leading goalkicker with 42 goals. The following season Croad lost confidence and kicked 18 goals. He cited homesickness and asked to be traded back to Victoria at the end of 2003.

Return to Hawthorn  
He was traded back to Hawthorn, this time only in return for pick 10, which was used by Fremantle to select Ryley Dunn. Croad was told that he would be the centre half back, with a regular position his form improved once he went back to the Hawks, winning All-Australian selection in 2005.

Croad relished the responsibility of being the senior man down back being strong, athletic type who took the oppositions best forward each week. During the second quarter of the 2008 Grand Final, Croad broke his left foot, and leaving the ground with the aid of trainers he still managed to lay a bump on Geelong's Joel Selwood before playing no further part in the game. Hawthorn went on to win the match and Croad earned his first premiership medallion in over 200 games of AFL football.

Croad missed the entire 2009 season due to his 2008 Grand Final injury, and on the 6th of January 2010 he announced his retirement after his surgeon warned him that he might permanently lose all function in his left foot if he broke it again.

Personal life 
In October 2006, Croad married Tanya Stewart, and had two daughters, Kiera (born July 2007) and Sierra (born October 2009). Croad became engaged to Kym Valentine in March 2015. In November, Valentine and Croad confirmed they were expecting their first child together. Valentine gave birth to a son named Phoenix in March 2016. Valentine and Croad split December 2017.

Croad currently operates a landscaping business and in August 2018 was accused of ripping off clients.

Controversy
As part of the investigation by the Australian Crime Commission into drugs and organised crime in Australian sport, he was named by Fairfax Media newspapers as being involved in a peptide supply deal that was linked to the Comanchero Motorcycle Club, an outlaw motorcycle gang. Croad later announced that he would sue Fairfax Media for defamation over the story.

Statistics

|- style=background:#EAEAEA
| 1998 ||  || 24
| 17 || 4 || 4 || 78 || 21 || 99 || 37 || 15 || 0.2 || 0.2 || 4.6 || 1.2 || 5.8 || 2.2 || 0.9 || 0
|-
| 1999 ||  || 24
| 21 || 16 || 10 || 200 || 70 || 270 || 102 || 22 || 0.8 || 0.5 || 9.5 || 3.3 || 12.9 || 4.9 || 1.0 || 6
|- style=background:#EAEAEA
| 2000 ||  || 24
| 22 || 33 || 24 || 228 || 88 || 316 || 127 || 9 || 1.5 || 1.1 || 10.4 || 4.0 || 14.4 || 5.8 || 0.4 || 7
|-
| 2001 ||  || 24
| 24 || 27 || 25 || 221 || 91 || 312 || 115 || 32 || 1.1 || 1.0 || 9.2 || 3.8 || 13.0 || 4.8 || 1.3 || 1
|- style=background:#EAEAEA
| 2002 ||  || 24
| 21 || 42 || 34 || 167 || 38 || 205 || 74 || 18 || 2.0 || 1.6 || 8.0 || 1.8 || 9.8 || 3.5 || 0.9 || 2
|-
| 2003 ||  || 24
| 17 || 18 || 20 || 128 || 40 || 168 || 43 || 28 || 1.1 || 1.2 || 7.5 || 2.4 || 9.9 || 2.5 || 1.6 || 0
|- style=background:#EAEAEA
| 2004 ||  || 24
| 21 || 7 || 8 || 211 || 79 || 290 || 111 || 26 || 0.3 || 0.4 || 10.0 || 3.8 || 13.8 || 5.3 || 1.2 || 2
|-
| 2005 ||  || 24
| 21 || 14 || 12 || 214 || 152 || 366 || 127 || 21 || 0.7 || 0.6 || 10.2 || 7.2 || 17.4 || 6.0 || 1.0 || 3
|- style=background:#EAEAEA
| 2006 ||  || 24
| 18 || 18 || 13 || 150 || 84 || 234 || 106 || 18 || 1.0 || 0.7 || 8.3 || 4.7 || 13.0 || 5.9 || 1.0 || 3
|-
| 2007 ||  || 24
| 20 || 10 || 8 || 136 || 110 || 246 || 106 || 13 || 0.5 || 0.4 || 6.8 || 5.5 || 12.3 || 5.3 || 0.7 || 0
|- style=background:#EAEAEA
| bgcolor=F0E68C | 2008# ||  || 24
| 20 || 0 || 0 || 111 || 90 || 201 || 87 || 14 || 0.0 || 0.0 || 5.6 || 4.5 || 10.1 || 4.4 || 0.7 || 1
|-
| 2009 ||  || 24
| 0 || — || — || — || — || — || — || — || — || — || — || — || — || — || — || 0
|- class="sortbottom"
! colspan=3| Career
! 222 !! 189 !! 158 !! 1844 !! 863 !! 2707 !! 1035 !! 216 !! 0.9 !! 0.7 !! 8.3 !! 3.9 !! 12.2 !! 4.7 !! 1.0 !! 25
|}

Honours and achievements
Team
 AFL premiership player: 2008

Individual
 All-Australian team: 2005
 Fremantle leading goalkicker: 2002
 AFL Rising Star nominee: 1998
 3× Australia international rules football team: 1999, 2000, 2005
  life member

References

External links

 

1980 births
Living people
VFL/AFL players born outside Australia
All-Australians (AFL)
Fremantle Football Club players
Hawthorn Football Club players
Hawthorn Football Club Premiership players
Victorian State of Origin players
New Zealand emigrants to Australia
New Zealand players of Australian rules football
Australian rules footballers from Melbourne
Dandenong Stingrays players
De La Salle OC Amateur Football Club players
Australia international rules football team players
Claremont Football Club players
One-time VFL/AFL Premiership players
People from Narre Warren